Rad (international title: Hell Track) is a 1986 American sports film directed by Hal Needham from a screenplay by Sam Bernard and Geoffrey Edwards (son of Pink Panther creator Blake Edwards). The film stars Bill Allen, Lori Loughlin, Talia Shire, Jack Weston and Ray Walston, along with 1984 Olympic gymnastics champion Bart Conner.

The film was a box office bomb, grossing $2 million against a budget of $3 million, and received mixed reviews from critics.

Plot
Cru Jones is a teenage BMX racer who lives in a small town with his younger sister Wesley and their mother. Cru is faced with a tough decision: qualify for Helltrack, or take the SAT in order to attend college. Winning Helltrack means $100,000, a new Chevrolet Corvette, and fame. Cru chooses the former option, against his mother's wishes.

The Helltrack race is endorsed by the city and by Duke Best, the duplicitous president of FAB (the Federation of American Bicyclists), who's also the owner of Mongoose Racing. Duke keeps adjusting the rules, in order to keep Cru out of the race, and also to ensure BMX star Bart Taylor has an easy road to victory thus providing a financial windfall for Mongoose Racing, Bart's sponsor.

Numerous BMX racers show up for Helltrack. Cru meets Christian Hollings, who becomes his romantic interest. At Cru's senior prom, he and Christian perform freestyle bike stunts on the dance floor to the awe of his classmates. After being blocked from the race due to a last-minute rule-change on participant sponsorship, Cru is ready to give up Helltrack until Wesley customizes a shirt for him to wear at the event. It reads "Cru is RAD." Inspired by this, Cru and his friends use the money he won from qualifying ($10,000) to found a small T-shirt business: "Rad Racing." However, a few days before the race, Duke changes the rules yet again claiming any company sponsoring a racer must be worth at least $50,000. When the townspeople hear about this, they rally around Cru; their contributions, particularly a generous donation from wealthy Mr. Timmer, provide Rad Racing with enough money for Cru to enter Helltrack.

During Helltrack, Duke bribes the Reynolds twins to take out Cru, but they fail. In the final stretch of the race, Taylor and Cru face each other; Cru ultimately wins Helltrack, while Taylor is dropped from Mongoose Racing. Now aware of Duke's true nature, the entire Mongoose team quits on him. Cru offers Taylor a spot in Rad Racing, while Duke is asked to resign from FAB.

Cast

Production
The film was partially shot in Cochrane, Alberta, Canada, as well as at Colonel Macleod Jr. High School and Bowness Park, both in Calgary, Alberta.

Reception
The film received mixed reviews and under-performed commercially during its release. The New York Times stated "Teen-age ears may not split from the music or ache from the dialogue, but anybody over 20, beware: 'You're willing to sacrifice building a solid future for a bicycle race,' says the hero's mother. 'It's very self-destructive.' If only he had listened to mom – but who can blame him for preferring his bicycle?" On the website Rotten Tomatoes, Rad was given an approval rating of 42%, based on reviews from 12 critics. In 2013, The Guardian writer Nick Evershed found it had the largest discrepancy between critical and audience response (which at that time was 0% based on 5 reviews, versus 91%, based on 7,165 user ratings) in the Rotten Tomatoes database, from a pool of 10,000 movies analyzed.

Film historian Leonard Maltin gave the movie a "BOMB" citation—the lowest possible rating in his annual Movie Guide—explaining, "Title is supposed to be short for Radical...as in, 'Radical, man!' Yeah, right...and we didn't see this same plotline used to death by 1950's hot-rod films, and also by 1970's roller-disco epics!"

Home media
The film was released on VHS and LaserDisc in 1986, where the film quickly found a following and became a top-ten video rental for two years after the film's release.

A 4K restoration of the film was released in a limited edition 4K UHD/Blu-ray combo pack by Utopia Distribution through the Vinegar Syndrome label in May 2020.

The film was released on iTunes on July 24, 2020.

Soundtrack

The soundtrack was released on 12" vinyl and cassette, by Curb Records in late 1986, and featured various artists including John Farnham in his pre-Whispering Jack days, 3 Speed, Sparks, Hubert Kah and Real Life. On February 9, 2014, it was released for digital download at the iTunes Store. It is also available to stream on Spotify. Farnham's "Break the Ice" was featured on a special list of the best songs from '80s action film montages that appeared on music website, No Echo.

US vinyl-LP and cassette track listing
 "Break The Ice" - John Farnham - 3:15
 "Riverside" - The Beat Farmers - 3:21
 "Wind Me Up" - 3-Speed - 3:49
 "Get Strange" - Hubert Kah - 3:06
 "Send Me An Angel" - Real Life - 3:57
 "Music That You Can Dance To" - Sparks - 4:24
 "Baby Come Back" - Jimmy Haddox - 4:03
 "Thunder In Your Heart" - John Farnham - 3:38
 "With You (Love Theme From Rad)" - John Farnham - 4:00

References

External links
 
 
 Rad at the TCM Movie Database
 Bill Allen's Book

1986 films
BMX mass media
Cycling films
TriStar Pictures films
Films directed by Hal Needham
1980s English-language films
American sports drama films
1980s American films